Nick A. Frentz (born June 29, 1963) is an American politician and member of the Minnesota Senate. A member of the Minnesota Democratic–Farmer–Labor Party (DFL), he represents District 19 in south-central Minnesota.

Early life, education, and career
Frentz was born on June 29, 1963, and grew up in Davis, California, where he graduated from high school. He is the son of a Mankato native.

Frentz attended Macalester College, graduating in 1984, and William Mitchell College of Law, graduating in 1987.

Frentz is a partner of Maschka, Riedy, Ries, and Frentz. Previously, he was a partner of Frentz and Frentz Law Offices, founded by his uncle and father, in Mankato. He is also a minority owner of Tandem Bagels, a local bakery and coffeehouse.

Minnesota Senate
Frentz was elected to the Minnesota Senate in 2016. He became the Assistant Minority Leader in 2021.

In 2017–2018, he served on the following committees: Aging and Long-Term Care Policy; Agriculture, Rural Development, and Housing Finance; Transportation Finance and Policy; Legislative Commission on Pensions and Retirement (2018); Senate Select Committee on Health Care Consumer Access and Affordability; Aggregate Resources Task Force.
 
In 2019–2020, he served on: Agriculture, Rural Development, and Housing Finance, Family Care and Aging, Transportation Finance and Policy, Legislative Commission on Pensions and Retirement.

In 2021–2022, he served on: Agriculture, Rural Development, and Housing Finance and Policy, Rules and Administration, and as Ranking Minority Member for Energy and Utilities Finance and Policy.

Personal life
Frentz and his wife, Jill, married in 1989. They have four children (Vanessa, Andrew, Derek & Sean) and reside in North Mankato.

References

External links

 Official Senate website
 Official campaign website

1963 births
Living people
Democratic Party Minnesota state senators
21st-century American politicians
William Mitchell College of Law alumni
Macalester College alumni
People from Davis, California
People from North Mankato, Minnesota